The Irish Presbyterian Mission high school, abbreviated as I P Mission School, is a school in Ahmedabad. Established in 1866 by the Irish Presbyterian Mission, it grew over the years in the major educational institutions group.

History
The Irish Presbyterian Mission high school was opened in June 1866 at the cost of the Presbyterian church in Ireland, the contributions amounting to £114 (Rs. 1140). It was first opened in Shahibaug and later shifted to new building near Ellis Bridge. In the beginning there were 34 students; by 1879 there were 201 students. Today it serves more than 11,000 students and professionals across Gujarat.

School building

The school building was one of the first modern structural construction was supervised by Rao Bahadur Himmatlal Engineer who also constructed the Ellis Bridge. The school was built of red bricks in Gothic architecture.

Gallery

See also
 Sheth Chimanlal Nagindas Vidyalaya

References 

Schools in Ahmedabad
1866 establishments in India
Gothic Revival architecture in India